Ramphastos is a genus of toucans, tropical and subtropical near passerine birds from Mexico, and Central and South America (with one species occurring in the Caribbean), which are brightly marked and have enormous, often colourful, bills.

Taxonomy
The genus Ramphastos was introduced in 1758 by the Swedish naturalist Carl Linnaeus in the tenth edition of his Systema Naturae. The name is from Ancient Greek ῥαμφηστης/rhamphēstēs meaning "snouted" (from ῥαμφη/rhampē meaning "bill"). The type species was later designated by Nicholas Aylward Vigors as the white-throated toucan (Ramphastos tucanus).

Species
The genus contains eight species:

Former species
Some authorities, either presently or formerly, recognize additional species or subspecies as species belonging to the genus Ramphastos including:
Green aracari (as Ramphastos viridis)
Ivory-billed aracari (as Ramphastos Azara)
Black-necked aracari (as Ramphastos Aracari)
Black-necked aracari (atricollis)  (as Ramphastos atricollis)
Collared aracari (as Ramphastos torquatus)
Saffron toucanet (as Ramphastos Bailloni)

Description
All have black wings, tails and thighs, but the colour of the remaining plumage depends on the exact species involved.

Diversity of bills

Distribution and habitat
They are essentially resident birds, but may take part in minor, local movements (e.g., to lower altitudes in the winter).

Behaviour and ecology

Breeding
They are arboreal and nest in tree holes laying 2–4 white eggs.

Food and feeding
All the species are basically fruit-eating, but will take insects and other small prey.

Threats
The ischnoceran louse Austrophilopterus cancellosus is suspected to parasitize all species of Ramphastos toucans. Its presence has been confirmed on all species except the citron-throated toucan.

References

External links 

 
Toucans
Bird genera